Ročinj ( or) is a village on the right bank of the Soča River in the Municipality of Kanal ob Soči in the Littoral region of Slovenia.

Church
The parish church in the settlement is dedicated to Saint Andrew and belongs to the Diocese of Koper. A second church belonging to this parish is built on a hill above the settlement and is dedicated to Saint Paul.

Notable people
Notable people that were born or lived in Ročinj include:
Donat Jug (1879–1952), beekeeper
Anka Makovec (1938–2017), Slovene-Australian artist and environmental activist

References

External links
Ročinj on Geopedia

Populated places in the Municipality of Kanal
Populated places in the Soča Valley